is a station on the Tokyo Monorail in Shinagawa, Tokyo, Japan.

Lines

Adjacent stations

History
Ōi Keibajō Mae Station opened on 27 May 1965.

Passenger statistics
In fiscal 2011, the station was used by an average of 8,537 passengers daily.

Surrounding area
The station is located next to the Ōi Racecourse (after which it is named), and is also used by commuters from the nearby Yashio housing development.

References

External links

  

Tokyo Monorail Haneda Line
Stations of Tokyo Monorail
Railway stations in Tokyo
Railway stations in Japan opened in 1965